Martín Calderón may refer to:
Martín Calderón (footballer, born 1979), Mexican football manager and former footballer
Martín Calderón (footballer, born 1999), Spanish footballer